A dwarf planet is a small planetary-mass object that is in direct orbit of the Sun, smaller than any of the eight classical planets but still a world in its own right. The prototypical dwarf planet is Pluto.

Of these nine plus the tenth-largest candidate , two have been visited by spacecraft (Pluto and Ceres) and seven others have at least one known moon (Eris, Haumea, Makemake, Gonggong, Quaoar, Orcus, and Salacia), which allows their masses and thus an estimate of their densities to be determined. Mass and density in turn can be fit into geophysical models in an attempt to determine the nature of these worlds. Only one, Sedna, has neither been visited nor has any known moons, making an accurate estimate of mass difficult. Some astronomers include many smaller bodies as well, but there is no consensus that these are likely to be dwarf planets. 

The term dwarf planet was coined by planetary scientist Alan Stern as part of a three-way categorization of planetary-mass objects in the Solar System: classical planets, dwarf planets, and satellite planets. Dwarf planets were thus conceived of as a category of planet. However, in 2006, the concept was adopted by the International Astronomical Union (IAU) as a category of sub–planetary objects, part of a three-way recategorization of bodies orbiting the Sun: planets, dwarf planets and small Solar System bodies. Thus Stern and other planetary geologists consider dwarf planets and large satellites to be planets, but since 2006, the IAU and perhaps the majority of astronomers have excluded them from the roster of planets.

History of the concept 

Starting in 1801, astronomers discovered Ceres and other bodies between Mars and Jupiter that for decades were considered to be planets. Between then and around 1851, when the number of planets had reached 23, astronomers started using the word asteroid (from Greek, meaning 'star-like' or 'star-shaped') for the smaller bodies and began to distinguish them as minor planets rather than major planets.

With the discovery of Pluto in 1930, most astronomers considered the Solar System to have nine major planets, along with thousands of significantly smaller bodies (asteroids and comets). For almost 50 years, Pluto was thought to be larger than Mercury, but with the discovery in 1978 of Pluto's moon Charon, it became possible to measure Pluto's mass accurately and to determine that it was much smaller than initial estimates. It was roughly one-twentieth the mass of Mercury, which made Pluto by far the smallest planet. Although it was still more than ten times as massive as the largest object in the asteroid belt, Ceres, it had only one-fifth the mass of Earth's Moon. Furthermore, having some unusual characteristics, such as large orbital eccentricity and a high orbital inclination, it became evident that it was a different kind of body from any of the other planets.

In the 1990s, astronomers began to find objects in the same region of space as Pluto (now known as the Kuiper belt), and some even farther away. 
Many of these shared several of Pluto's key orbital characteristics, and Pluto started being seen as the largest member of a new class of objects, the plutinos. It became clear that either the larger of these bodies would also have to be classified as planets, or Pluto would have to be reclassified, much as Ceres had been reclassified after the discovery of additional asteroids.
This led some astronomers to stop referring to Pluto as a planet. Several terms, including subplanet and planetoid, started to be used for the bodies now known as dwarf planets. 
Astronomers were also confident that more objects as large as Pluto would be discovered, and the number of planets would start growing quickly if Pluto were to remain classified as a planet.

Eris (then known as ) was discovered in January 2005; it was thought to be slightly larger than Pluto, and some reports informally referred to it as the tenth planet. As a consequence, the issue became a matter of intense debate during the IAU General Assembly in August 2006. The IAU's initial draft proposal included Charon, Eris, and Ceres in the list of planets. After many astronomers objected to this proposal, an alternative was drawn up by the Uruguayan astronomers Julio Ángel Fernández and Gonzalo Tancredi: they proposed an intermediate category for objects large enough to be round but which had not cleared their orbits of planetesimals. Beside dropping Charon from the list, the new proposal also removed Pluto, Ceres, and Eris, because they have not cleared their orbits.

Although concerns were raised about the classification of planets orbiting other stars, the issue was not resolved; it was proposed instead to decide this only when dwarf-planet-size objects start to be observed.

In the immediate aftermath of the IAU definition of dwarf planet, some scientists expressed their disagreement with the IAU resolution. Campaigns included car bumper stickers and T-shirts. Mike Brown (the discoverer of Eris) agrees with the reduction of the number of planets to eight.

NASA announced in 2006 that it would use the new guidelines established by the IAU. Alan Stern, the director of NASA's mission to Pluto, rejects the current IAU definition of planet, both in terms of defining dwarf planets as something other than a type of planet, and in using orbital characteristics (rather than intrinsic characteristics) of objects to define them as dwarf planets. Thus, in 2011, he still referred to Pluto as a planet, and accepted other likely dwarf planets such as Ceres and Eris, as well as the larger moons, as additional planets. Several years before the IAU definition, he used orbital characteristics to separate "überplanets" (the dominant eight) from "unterplanets" (the dwarf planets), considering both types "planets".

Name 

Names for large subplanetary bodies include dwarf planet, planetoid (more general term), meso-planet (narrowly used for sizes between Mercury and Ceres), quasi-planet and (in the transneptunian region) plutoid. Dwarf planet, however, was originally coined as a term for the smallest planets, not the largest sub-planets, and is still used that way by many planetary astronomers. 

Alan Stern coined the term dwarf planet, analogous to the term dwarf star, as part of a three-fold classification of planets, and he and many of his colleagues continue to classify dwarf planets as a class of planets. The IAU decided that dwarf planets are not to be considered planets, but kept Stern's term for them. Other terms for the IAU definition of the largest subplanetary bodies that do not have such conflicting connotations or usage include quasi-planet
and the older term planetoid ("having the form of a planet"). Michael E. Brown stated that planetoid is "a perfectly good word" that has been used for these bodies for years, and that the use of the term dwarf planet for a non-planet is "dumb", but that it was motivated by an attempt by the IAU division III plenary session to reinstate Pluto as a planet in a second resolution. Indeed, the draft of Resolution 5A had called these median bodies planetoids, but the plenary session voted unanimously to change the name to dwarf planet. The second resolution, 5B, defined dwarf planets as a subtype of planet, as Stern had originally intended, distinguished from the other eight that were to be called "classical planets". Under this arrangement, the twelve planets of the rejected proposal were to be preserved in a distinction between eight classical planets and four dwarf planets. Resolution 5B was defeated in the same session that 5A was passed. Because of the semantic inconsistency of a dwarf planet not being a planet due to the failure of Resolution 5B, alternative terms such as nanoplanet and subplanet were discussed, but there was no consensus among the CSBN to change it.

In most languages equivalent terms have been created by translating dwarf planet more-or-less literally: French , Spanish , German , Russian karlikovaya planeta, Arabic kaukab qazm, Chinese ǎixíngxīng, Korean waesohangseong or waehangseong, but in Japanese they are called junwakusei, meaning "quasi-planets" or "peneplanets" (pene- meaning "almost").

IAU Resolution 6a of 2006 recognizes Pluto as "the prototype of a new category of trans-Neptunian objects". The name and precise nature of this category were not specified but left for the IAU to establish at a later date; in the debate leading up to the resolution, the members of the category were variously referred to as plutons and plutonian objects but neither name was carried forward, perhaps due to objections from geologists that this would create confusion with their pluton.

On June 11, 2008, the IAU Executive Committee announced a new term, plutoid, and a definition: all trans-Neptunian dwarf planets are plutoids. However, other departments of the IAU have rejected the term: 

The category of 'plutoid' captured an earlier distinction between the 'terrestrial dwarf' Ceres and the 'ice dwarfs' of the outer Solar system, part of a conception of a threefold division of the Solar System into inner terrestrial planets, central gas giants and outer ice dwarfs, of which Pluto was the principal member. 'Ice dwarf' however also saw some use as an umbrella term for all trans-Neptunian minor planets, or for the ice asteroids of the outer Solar System; one attempted definition was that an ice dwarf "is larger than the nucleus of a normal comet and icier than a typical asteroid."
	
Since the Dawn mission, it has been recognized that Ceres is an icy body more similar to the icy moons of the outer planets and to TNOs such as Pluto than it is to the terrestrial planets, blurring the distinction,
and Ceres has since been called an ice dwarf as well.

Criteria 

The category dwarf planet arose from a conflict between dynamical and geophysical ideas of what a useful conception of a planet would be. In terms of the dynamics of the Solar System, the major distinction is between bodies that gravitationally dominate their neighbourhood (Mercury through Neptune) and those which do not (such as the asteroids and Kuiper belt objects). However, a celestial body may have a dynamic (planetary) geology at approximately the mass required for its mantle to become plastic under its own weight, which results in the body acquiring a round shape. Because this requires a much lower mass than gravitationally dominating the region of space near their orbit, there are a population of objects that are massive enough to have a world-like appearance and planetary geology, but not massive enough to clear their neighborhood. Examples are Ceres in the asteroid belt and Pluto in the Kuiper belt.

Dynamicists usually prefer using gravitational dominance as the threshold for planethood, because from their perspective smaller bodies are better grouped with their neighbours, e.g. Ceres as simply a large asteroid and Pluto as a large Kuiper belt object. However, geoscientists usually prefer roundness as the threshold, because from their perspective the internally driven geology of a body like Ceres makes it more similar to a classical planet like Mars, than to a small asteroid that lacks internally driven geology. This necessitated the creation of the category of dwarf planets to describe this intermediate class.

Orbital dominance 

Alan Stern and Harold F. Levison introduced a parameter Λ (lambda), expressing the likelihood of an encounter resulting in a given deflection of orbit. The value of this parameter in Stern's model is proportional to the square of the mass and inversely proportional to the period. This value can be used to estimate the capacity of a body to clear the neighbourhood of its orbit, where Λ > 1 will eventually clear it. A gap of five orders of magnitude in Λ was found between the smallest terrestrial planets and the largest asteroids and Kuiper belt objects.

Using this parameter, Steven Soter and other astronomers argued for a distinction between planets and dwarf planets based on the inability of the latter to "clear the neighbourhood around their orbits": planets are able to remove smaller bodies near their orbits by collision, capture, or gravitational disturbance (or establish orbital resonances that prevent collisions), whereas dwarf planets lack the mass to do so. Soter went on to propose a parameter he called the planetary discriminant, designated with the symbol µ (mu), that represents an experimental measure of the actual degree of cleanliness of the orbital zone (where µ is calculated by dividing the mass of the candidate body by the total mass of the other objects that share its orbital zone), where µ > 100 is deemed to be cleared.

Jean-Luc Margot refined Stern and Levison's concept to produce a similar parameter Π (Pi). It is based on theory, avoiding the empirical data used by Λ. Π > 1 indicates a planet, and there is again a gap of several orders of magnitude between planets and dwarf planets.

There are several other schemes that try to differentiate between planets and dwarf planets, but the 2006 definition uses this concept.

Hydrostatic equilibrium 

Enough internal pressure, caused by the body's gravitation, will turn a body plastic, and enough plasticity will allow high elevations to sink and hollows to fill in, a process known as gravitational relaxation. Bodies smaller than a few kilometers are dominated by non-gravitational forces and tend to have an irregular shape and may be rubble piles. Larger objects, where gravity is significant but not dominant, are potato-shaped; the more massive the body, the higher its internal pressure, the more solid it is and the more rounded its shape, until the pressure is enough to overcome its compressive strength and it achieves hydrostatic equilibrium. Then, a body is as round as it is possible to be, given its rotation and tidal effects, and is an ellipsoid in shape. This is the defining limit of a dwarf planet.

If an object is in hydrostatic equilibrium, a global layer of liquid on its surface would form a surface of the same shape as the body, apart from small-scale surface features such as craters and fissures. The body will have a spherical shape if it doesn't rotate and an ellipsoidal one if it does. The faster it rotates, the more oblate or even scalene it becomes. If such a rotating body were heated until it melts, its shape would not change. If the body has a massive nearby companion, then tidal forces gradually slow its rotation until it is tidally locked; that is, it always presents the same face to its companion. Tidally locked bodies are also scalene, though sometimes only slightly so. Earth's Moon is tidally locked, as are all the rounded satellites of the gas giants. Pluto and Charon are tidally locked to each other, as are Eris and Dysnomia. 

There are no specific size or mass limits of dwarf planets, as those are not defining features. There is no clear upper limit: an object very far out the Solar system that is more massive than Mercury might not have had time to clear its neighbourhood; such a body would fit the definition of dwarf planet rather than planet. The lower limit is determined by the requirements of achieving and retaining hydrostatic equilibrium, but the size or mass at which an object attains and retains equilibrium and depends on its composition and thermal history, not simply its mass. An IAU question-and-answer press release from 2006 estimated that objects with mass above  and radius greater than 400 km would "normally" be in hydrostatic equilibrium ("the shape ... would normally be determined by self-gravity"), but that "all borderline cases would need to be determined by observation." No other body with a measured mass is close to the expected mass limit, though several without a measured mass approach the expected size limit.

Population of dwarf planets 

There is no clear definition of what constitutes a dwarf planet, and whether to classify an object as one is up to individual astronomers. Thus, the number of dwarf planets in the Solar System is unknown.

The three objects under consideration during the debates leading up to the 2006 IAU acceptance of the category of dwarf planet – Ceres, Pluto and Eris – are generally accepted as dwarf planets, including by those astronomers who continue to classify dwarf planets as planets. Only one of them – Pluto – has been observed in enough detail to verify that its current shape fits what would be expected from hydrostatic equilibrium. Ceres is close to equilibrium, but some gravitational anomalies remain unexplained.  Eris is generally assumed to be a dwarf planet because it is more massive than Pluto.

In order of discovery, these three bodies are:
   – discovered January 1, 1801 and announced January 24, 45 years before Neptune. Considered a planet for half a century before reclassification as an asteroid. Considered a dwarf planet by the IAU since the adoption of Resolution 5A on August 24, 2006. Confirmation is pending.
    –  discovered February 18, 1930 and announced March 13. Considered a planet for 76 years. Explicitly reclassified as a dwarf planet by the IAU with Resolution 6A on August 24, 2006. Five known moons.
   – discovered January 5, 2005 and announced July 29. Called the "tenth planet" in media reports. Considered a dwarf planet by the IAU since the adoption of Resolution 5A on August 24, 2006, and named by the IAU dwarf-planet naming committee on September 13 of that year. One known moon.

The IAU only established guidelines for which committee would oversee the naming of likely dwarf planets: any unnamed trans-Neptunian object with an absolute magnitude brighter than +1 (and hence a minimum diameter of 838 km at the maximum geometric albedo of 1) was to be named by a joint committee consisting of the Minor Planet Center and the planetary working group of the IAU. These bodies are generally assumed to be dwarf planets, although they have not yet been demonstrated to be in hydrostatic equilibrium, and there is some disagreement for Haumea:

These five bodies – the three under consideration in 2006 (Pluto, Ceres and Eris) plus the two named in 2008 (Haumea and Makemake) – are commonly presented as the dwarf planets of the Solar System, though the limiting factor (albedo) is not what defines an object as a dwarf planet. 
 
The astronomical community commonly refers to other larger TNOs as dwarf planets as well. At least four additional bodies meet the preliminary criteria of Brown, of Tancredi et al., and of Grundy et al. for identifying dwarf planets, and are generally called dwarf planets by astronomers as well:

Most of the larger bodies have moons, which enables a determination of their mass and thus their density, which inform estimates of whether they could be dwarf planets. The largest TNOs that are not known to have moons are Sedna,  and Ixion. In particular, Salacia has a known mass and diameter putting it as a borderline case by the IAU's 2006 Q&A.

At the time Makemake and Haumea were named, it was thought that trans-Neptunian objects (TNOs) with icy cores would require a diameter of only about 400 km (250 mi), or 3% the size of Earththe size of the moons Mimas, the smallest moon that is round, and Proteus, the largest that is notto relax into gravitational equilibrium. Researchers thought that the number of such bodies could prove to be around 200 in the Kuiper belt, with thousands more beyond.
This was one of the reasons (keeping the roster of 'planets' to a reasonable number) that Pluto was reclassified in the first place. 
However, research since then has cast doubt on the idea that bodies that small could have achieved or maintained equilibrium under the typical conditions of the Kuiper belt and beyond.

Individual astronomers have recognized a number of objects as dwarf planets or as likely to prove to be dwarf planets. In 2008, Tancredi et al. advised the IAU to officially accept Orcus, Sedna and Quaoar as dwarf planets (Gonggong was not yet known), though the IAU did not address the issue then and has not since.
Since 2011, Brown has maintained a list of hundreds of candidate objects, ranging from "nearly certain" to "possible" dwarf planets, based solely on estimated size. 
Notably, Gonggong may have a larger diameter than Pluto's round moon Charon (1212 km).

They accept that brighter (albedo > ≈0.2) or denser (> ≈1.4 g/cc) Orcus and Quaoar probably were fully solid:

Salacia was later found to have a somewhat higher density, comparable within uncertainties to that of Orcus, though still with a very dark surface. Despite this determination, Grundy et al. call it "dwarf-planet sized", while calling Orcus a dwarf planet. Later studies on Varda suggest that its density may also be high, though a low density could not be excluded.

Most likely dwarf planets
The trans-Neptunian objects in the following tables, except Salacia, are agreed by Brown, Tancredi et al. and Grundy et al. to be probable dwarf planets, or close to it. Salacia has been included as the largest TNO not generally agreed to be a dwarf planet and a borderline body by many criteria. Charon, a moon of Pluto that was proposed as a dwarf planet by the IAU in 2006, is included for comparison. Those objects that have absolute magnitude greater than +1, and so meet the threshold of the joint planet–minor planet naming committee of the IAU, are highlighted, as is Ceres, which the IAU has assumed is a dwarf planet since they first debated the concept.

Symbols 

Ceres  and Pluto  received planetary symbols, as they were considered to be planets when they were discovered. By the time the others were discovered, planetary symbols had mostly fallen out of use among astronomers. Unicode includes symbols for the dwarf planets Quaoar , Sedna , Orcus , Haumea , Eris , Makemake , and Gonggong  that are primarily used by astrologers: they were devised by Denis Moskowitz, a software engineer in Massachusetts. NASA has used his Haumea, Eris, and Makemake symbols, as well as the traditional astrological symbol for Pluto  when referring to it as a dwarf planet.

Exploration 

On March 6, 2015, the Dawn spacecraft entered orbit around Ceres, becoming the first spacecraft to visit a dwarf planet. On July 14, 2015, the New Horizons space probe flew by Pluto and its five moons.

Ceres displays such evidence of an active geology as salt deposits and cryovolcanos, while Pluto has water-ice mountains drifting in nitrogen-ice glaciers, as well as a significant atmosphere. 
Ceres evidently has brine percolating through its subsurface, while there is evidence that Pluto has an actual subsurface ocean.

Dawn had previously orbited the asteroid Vesta. Saturn's moon Phoebe has been imaged by Cassini and before that by Voyager 2, which also encountered Neptune's moon Triton. All three bodies show evidence of once being dwarf planets, and their exploration helps clarify the evolution of dwarf planets.

Similar objects
A number of bodies physically resemble dwarf planets. These include former dwarf planets, which may still have equilibrium shape or evidence of active geology; planetary-mass moons, which meet the physical but not the orbital definition for dwarf planet; and Charon in the Pluto–Charon system, which is arguably a binary dwarf planet. The categories may overlap: Triton, for example, is both a former dwarf planet and a planetary-mass moon.

Former dwarf planets 

Vesta, the next-most-massive body in the asteroid belt after Ceres, was once in hydrostatic equilibrium and is roughly spherical, deviating mainly due to massive impacts that formed the Rheasilvia and Veneneia craters after it solidified. 
Its dimensions are not consistent with it currently being in hydrostatic equilibrium.
Triton is more massive than Eris or Pluto, has an equilibrium shape, and is thought to be a captured dwarf planet (likely a member of a binary system), but no longer directly orbits the sun. 
Phoebe is a captured centaur that, like Vesta, is no longer in hydrostatic equilibrium, but is thought to have been so early in its history due to radiogenic heating.

Evidence from 2019 suggests that Theia, the former planet that collided with Earth in the giant-impact hypothesis, may have originated in the outer Solar System rather than the inner Solar System and that Earth's water originated on Theia, thus implying that Theia may have been a former dwarf planet from the Kuiper Belt.

Planetary-mass moons 

At least nineteen moons have equilibrium shape from having relaxed under self-gravity at some point, though some have since frozen solid and are no longer in equilibrium. Seven are more massive than either Eris or Pluto. These moons are not physically distinct from the dwarf planets, but do not fit the IAU definition because they do not directly orbit the Sun. (Indeed, Neptune's moon Triton is a captured dwarf planet, and Ceres formed in the same region of the Solar System as the moons of Jupiter and Saturn.) Alan Stern calls planetary-mass moons "satellite planets", one of three categories of planet, together with dwarf planets and classical planets. The term planemo ("planetary-mass object") also covers all three populations.

Charon 
There has been some debate as to whether the Pluto–Charon system should be considered a double dwarf planet. 
In a draft resolution for the IAU definition of planet, both Pluto and Charon were considered planets in a binary system. The IAU currently says Charon is not considered a dwarf planet but rather a satellite of Pluto, though the idea that Charon might qualify as a dwarf planet may be considered at a later date. However, it is no longer clear that Charon is in hydrostatic equilibrium. Also, the location of the barycenter depends not only on the relative masses of the bodies, but also on the distance between them; the barycenter of the Sun–Jupiter orbit, for example, lies outside the Sun, but they are not considered a binary object. Thus, a formal definition of what constitutes a binary (dwarf) planet must be established before Pluto and Charon are formally defined as binary dwarf planets.

See also 

 Centaur
 Lists of astronomical objects
 List of former planets
 List of gravitationally rounded objects of the Solar System
 List of planetary bodies
 List of possible dwarf planets
 Lists of small Solar System bodies

Notes

References

External links 

 NPR: Dwarf Planets May Finally Get Respect (David Kestenbaum, Morning Edition)
 BBC News: Q&A New planets proposal, August 16, 2006
 Ottawa Citizen: The case against Pluto (P. Surdas Mohit) August 24, 2006
 James L. Hilton: When Did the Asteroids Become Minor Planets?
 NASA: IYA 2009 Dwarf Planets

 
1990s neologisms
Minor planets
Planemos
Types of planet
Concepts in astronomy